is a Japanese former cyclist. He competed in the 1 km time trial event at the 1988 Summer Olympics.

References

External links
 

1969 births
Living people
Japanese male cyclists
Olympic cyclists of Japan
Cyclists at the 1988 Summer Olympics
People from Sasebo
Sportspeople from Nagasaki Prefecture
Asian Games medalists in cycling
Asian Games silver medalists for Japan
Cyclists at the 1986 Asian Games
Cyclists at the 1990 Asian Games
Medalists at the 1986 Asian Games
Medalists at the 1990 Asian Games